The 50th edition of the annual Four Hills Tournament marked the first time an athlete won all four events of the tournament. In the past, fifteen times a ski jumper won three out of four events, but never the 'Grand Slam'. Sven Hannawald's feat would not be repeated until 2017-18 by Kamil Stoch.

Format

At each of the four events, a qualification round was held. The 50 best jumpers qualified for the competition. The fifteen athletes leading the World Cup at the time qualified automatically. In case of an omitted qualification or a result that would normally result in elimination, they would instead qualify as 50th.

Unlike the procedure at normal World Cup events, the 50 qualified athletes were paired up for the first round of the final event, with the winner proceeding to the second round. The rounds start with the duel between #26 and #25 from the qualification round, followed by #27 vs #24, up to #50 vs #1. The five best duel losers, so-called 'Lucky Losers' also proceed.

For the tournament ranking, the total points earned from each jump are added together. The World Cup points collected during the four events are disregarded in this ranking.

Pre-Tournament World Cup Standings

At the time of the tournament, nine out of twenty-eight World Cup events were already held. Title holder Adam Małysz had won six of them, a fourth place being his worst finish of the season so far. Thus, he went into the tournament as favourite.

The standings were as follows:

Participating nations and athletes

The number of jumpers a nation was allowed to nominate was dependent on previous results. At each event, a 'national group' of ten jumpers from the host country was added.

The defending champion was Adam Małysz. Six other competitors had also previously won the Four Hills tournament: Toni Nieminen in 1991-92, Andreas Goldberger in 1992-93 and 1994–95, Primož Peterka in 1996-97, Kazuyoshi Funaki in 1997-98, Janne Ahonen in 1998-99 and Andreas Widhölzl in 1999-00.

The following athletes were nominated:

Results

Oberstorf
 Schattenbergschanze, Oberstorf
29-30 December 2001

Qualification winner:  Andreas Widhölzl

Garmisch-Partenkirchen
 Große Olympiaschanze, Garmisch-Partenkirchen
31 December 2001 - 1 January 2002

Qualification winner:  Andreas Widhölzl

Innsbruck
 Bergiselschanze, Innsbruck
03-04 January 2002

With a comfortable lead from the first half of the tournament already to his name, Sven Hannawald won by over 20 points in Innsbruck, all but securing him the title. In the event's first round, Hannawald beat his direct duel opponent Martin Höllwarth by eight meters - Höllwarth's jump was still the second best of the entire round.

Qualification winner:  Martin Höllwarth

Bischofshofen
 Paul-Ausserleitner-Schanze, Bischofshofen
05-06 January 2002

With Hannawald's large lead after three events, the only hope for his rivals was a failure to proceed to the event's final round. Instead, the German yet again displayed the event's best jump in the first round and did not only secure tournament victory, but became the first athlete in the 50 years of Four Hills history to win all four events.

Qualification winner:  Matti Hautamäki

Final ranking

References

External links
 FIS website
 Four Hills Tournament web site

 
Fis Ski Jumping World Cup, 2002-03
Fis Ski Jumping World Cup, 2002-03